Sergio Daniel Martínez Alzuri (born 15 February 1969), nicknamed "Manteca", is a Uruguayan former professional footballer who played as a striker. He was two times top scorer in the Argentine Primera División during his five years with Boca Juniors. He also played professionally in Spain.

Club career
Born in Montevideo, Martínez started his professional career with Defensor Sporting Club in 1986. In 1991 he signed for giants C.A. Peñarol, switching to Argentina in the following year with Boca Juniors.

In his five years with Boca, Martínez won the Apertura in 1992 and the Copa de Oro in 1993, being crowned the Apertura 1993's top scorer with 12 goals and the Clausura 1997's with 15; upon his departure, he ranked seventh in the club's all-time scoring list with 86 goals in 167 games (all competitions).

In January 1998, Martínez moved to Spain to play for Deportivo de La Coruña, only appearing in three La Liga matches in more than one year before returning to his homeland to finish his career, at Club Nacional de Football.

International career
In 1995, Martínez helped Uruguay win the Copa América, scoring the decisive penalty in the shootout against Brazil in the final. The recipient of 35 full caps, he was also summoned for the 1990 FIFA World Cup, appearing in one game as the national side exited in the round of 16 (90 minutes against South Korea, 1–0 triumph).

Honours

Club
 Defensor
Uruguayan Primera División: 1987

 Boca Juniors
Argentine Primera División: Apertura 1992
Copa de Oro: 1993

 Nacional
Uruguayan Primera División: 2000, 2001

International
 Uruguay
Copa América: 1995

Individual
 Boca Juniors
Primera División Top Scorer: Clausura 1997

References

External links
 National team data 
 
 
  

1969 births
Living people
Footballers from Montevideo
Uruguayan footballers
Association football forwards
Uruguayan Primera División players
Defensor Sporting players
Peñarol players
Club Nacional de Football players
Argentine Primera División players
Boca Juniors footballers
La Liga players
Deportivo de La Coruña players
Uruguay international footballers
1990 FIFA World Cup players
1989 Copa América players
1991 Copa América players
1995 Copa América players
1997 Copa América players
Copa América-winning players
Uruguayan expatriate footballers
Expatriate footballers in Argentina
Expatriate footballers in Spain
Uruguayan expatriate sportspeople in Argentina
Uruguayan expatriate sportspeople in Spain